Amy Lynn Carlson (born July 7, 1968) is an American actress known for her roles as Linda Reagan in the CBS police procedural Blue Bloods, as Alex Taylor on the NBC drama Third Watch, and Josie Watts in the NBC daytime soap opera Another World.

Early life 
Carlson was born in Elmhurst, DuPage County, Illinois, near Chicago, and was raised in Glen Ellyn, Illinois, the daughter of schoolteacher parents, Barbara Jane (Hultman) and Robert Eugene Carlson. She is of Swedish descent, with roots in Småland.

Career

1986–1992: College and early career 
She was introduced to Hollywood when she worked as a background actor in the film Lucas starring Charlie Sheen, Corey Haim, and Winona Ryder. Later she followed her older sister Betsy to Knox College in Galesburg, Illinois. While in college, Carlson was active in the school's theatre department, appearing in Fifth of July, Noises Off, A Lie of the Mind, and School for Scandal. She also got her first taste of directing when she directed Wallace Shawn's Aunt Dan and Lemon her senior year. Carlson graduated cum laude with a degree in East Asian Studies with a concentration in theater.

After graduating college, Carlson moved to Chicago where she studied improv with Charna Halpern at the Harold ImprovOlympic, and took acting classes at The Actor's Center with Victor D'Altorio and Eileen Vorbach. She also appeared in many small theater productions including Dark City, Revenge of the Cheerleader with Warren Leight and Theater of the Film Noir at the Folio Theater Company, among many others. She also appeared in three episodes of The Untouchables starring William Forsythe and Tom Amandes as three different characters. Carlson also appeared in three episodes of Missing Persons with Daniel J. Travanti as three different characters. On Missing Persons, she met Jorja Fox and not only did they share birthdays, they became lifelong friends. Other credits from Chicago include improv with Harold ImprovOlympic. She also played in Legacy of Lies a made for TV movie with Joe Morton.

1993–2003: Television contracts, films and relief work 

Carlson landed the role of Josie Watts and moved to New York in late December 1993 to make her soap opera debut on Another World. During her first year, she traveled with World Vision to Rwanda to work on an awareness campaign after the war. She used her status on the soap opera to write several articles about the suffering in Rwanda that she witnessed for the large base of fans in soap opera magazines, such as Soap Opera Weekly. Later, she was nominated for a Daytime Emmy Award for Outstanding Supporting Actress in a Drama Series in 1998 but after her contract ended, she decided it was time to move on. She immediately flew to Toronto to shoot Thanks of a Grateful Nation, about Persian Gulf War syndrome.

Carlson moved to Los Angeles for the first and only time in 1998, where she guest-starred in a number of prime time shows including NYPD Blue, had a recurring role on the show Get Real which starred Anne Hathaway and Jesse Eisenberg, and filmed If These Walls Could Talk Part 2 directed by Martha Coolidge. While in LA, she tested against Mariska Hargitay and Angie Harmon for the role that Mariska won in Law and Order: SVU. Soon after, Les Moonves placed her in the CBS TV Series Falcone as Donny Brasco's wife, shot in Toronto. Falcone brought her back East where she remained, guest starring in Law and Order: SVU and filming independent films such as Winning Girls Through Psychic Mind Control directed by Barry Alexander Brown starring Bronson Pinchot and Ruben Santiago-Hudson. In it, Carlson played a down and out lounge singer and the production used the voice of the at the time up and coming singer, Regina Spektor.

2004–2017: Prime Time Highlights and Children 
After leaving Third Watch, Carlson went on to star on Peacemakers, a CSI-inspired show, shot in Vancouver and set in the late 1800's, starring opposite Tom Berenger and Peter O'Meara. When the show was not renewed, she worked on several TV shows and films including a Law and Order episode entitled "Dead Wives Club". Soon Dick Wolf was calling to sign her to Law & Order: Trial by Jury where she co-starred alongside Bebe Neuwirth, Jerry Orbach, Kirk Acevedo, Fred Thompson, and Scott Cohen. The series attracted tremendous guest stars whom she was thrilled to work with such as Bradley Cooper, Angela Lansbury, Candice Bergen, Elisabeth Moss, and more. After giving birth to her daughter, Lyla Forest in 2006, Carlson continued to work on a variety of film and television roles such as Guest Starring roles on Criminal Minds and Fringe. When her son Nigel was 10 months old she landed the role of Linda Reagan on Blue Bloods. Carlson continued in the role of Linda through the seventh season of Blue Bloods. During her hiatus, she played Erin Callan in Too Big to Fail directed by Curtis Hanson from the book written by Andrew Ross Sorkin chronicling the financial meltdown of 2008 working alongside James Woods. She was also written for the role of Christina Cassertes, by her friend David Cross in his directorial debut film, Hits. After seven years on Blue Bloods, Carlson's contract came to an end. In the eighth-season premiere episode, which aired on September 29, 2017, it was revealed that Linda—who was a nurse—had died in a helicopter crash while transporting a patient.

2018–present: Current work 

Following Blue Bloods, Carlson worked recurring roles on The Society and The Village. She also shot films Sunny Daze, The Incoherents, A Bread Factory Part One, and the indie horror film Know Fear. Just prior to COVID-19 shutdowns, Carlson co-wrote, directed and starred in a short film, The Letter, co-written by Syd Butler. She cast her friend from Law and Order: Trial by Jury, Scott Cohen as her co-star. Her work was honored with best director and actor at the Hollywood International Women's Film Festival, as well as awards with the Cannes Indie Film Festival, Hudson Valley Film Festival and Dark Women Film Festival.

During the 2020 pandemic, Carlson and her partner Syd Butler along with his bandmate Seth Jabour (Les Savy Fav, 8G Band), who together form the band Office Romance, finished and released their second album and first full length album, Holidays of Love.

In 2021, Carlson began shooting as a recurring cast member on FBI: Most Wanted, opposite her friend and co-star from Another World, Julian McMahon.

Personal life
Carlson resides in New York City with her long-time partner Syd Butler. They have two children.

Awards
In 2018, Carlson was presented with the Muhammad Ali Award for Gender Equality. In 2021, she won a Knox College Alumni Achievement Award.

Filmography

Film

Television

References

External links
 

American television actresses
American film actresses
American soap opera actresses
People from Glen Ellyn, Illinois
Living people
Knox College (Illinois) alumni
20th-century American actresses
21st-century American actresses
People from Fort Greene, Brooklyn
1968 births